Eucosmodontidae is a poorly preserved family of fossil mammals within the extinct order Multituberculata. Representatives are known from strata dating from the Upper Cretaceous through the Lower Eocene of North America, as well as the Paleocene to Eocene of Europe. The family is part of the suborder of Cimolodonta.  They might be related with the Djadochtatherioidea but without further finds, this remains unclear.  Other than a partial snout, fossil evidence is limited to teeth.

The taxonomic name Eucosmodontidae was given by Jepsen in 1940. Some authors interpret this version of Eucosmodontidae and Microcosmodontidae as being subfamilies rather than families.

References 
 Most of this information has been derived from  MESOZOIC MAMMALS; Eucosmodontidae, Microcosmodontidae and Taeniolabidoidea, an Internet directory.
 Kielan-Jaworowska Z. and Hurum J.H. (2001), "Phylogeny and Systematics of multituberculate mammals". Paleontology 44, p. 389-429.

Cimolodonts
Late Cretaceous first appearances
Eocene extinctions
Prehistoric mammal families